Ivica "Ivo" Cipci (born 25 April 1933) is a retired Croatian water polo player. He was part of the Yugoslav teams that won silver medals at the 1956 Olympics and 1958 European Championships. At the 1956 Olympics he played all seven matches and was the tournament's top scorer.

Cipci took up swimming in 1946, but soon changed to water polo, and won the national title with VK Jadran in 1954, 1957 and 1961. In 1970 he became a board member of Jadran, and from 1974 to 1994 acted as president of the club or/and of its water polo section.  He is married to the Slovenian swimmer Majda Majcen.

See also
 List of Olympic medalists in water polo (men)

References

External links

 

1933 births
Living people
Water polo players from Split, Croatia
Croatian male water polo players
Yugoslav male water polo players
Olympic water polo players of Yugoslavia
Water polo players at the 1956 Summer Olympics
Water polo players at the 1960 Summer Olympics
Olympic silver medalists for Yugoslavia
Franjo Bučar Award winners
Olympic medalists in water polo
Medalists at the 1956 Summer Olympics